South Bowenfels is a suburb in the City of Lithgow, New South Wales, Australia.

History 
The suburb was previously known as Old Bowenfels.

Heritage listings
Old Bowenfels has a number of heritage-listed sites, including:
 70 Mudgee Street: Bowenfels National School Site

References 

 
City of Lithgow